The Mag is an independent and alternative music magazine in the United Kingdom which has been published online since 2003. Contributions in the form of reviews and music articles were made by aspiring music journalists, photographers and enthusiasts such as Steve Fenton, Pete Habert, Stuart Smith and Mark Holloway.

The Mag gained exposure in 2006 when the magazine's website became the largest of its kind (source Alexa Internet - Independent and Alternative Music) and it reached its peak in 2007, hosting an awards show that gained recognition from the BBC, as well as radio stations Original 106 (Solent) and Southern Counties Radio.

History
The magazine's first edition was published as an 8-page local music guide in Salisbury, Wiltshire. However, due to distribution issues, the physical edition was replaced with a website on 9 July 2003.

In December 2006, The Mag were the first to report on the Delays new record deal with Fiction Records as they were present backstage at Southampton Guildhall to interview lead singer Greg Gilbert when the deal was signed.

In 2007, www.the-mag.me.uk were awarded the runners-up prize in the category 'Best Interactive Website' at the HantsWeb awards run by Hampshire County Council.

In 2019, The Mag was re-branded with the new name Phonotonal.

The Mag Awards

The Mag Awards is an annual award show voted for by readers of the magazine, from a list of all bands featured in the preceding year.

The Mag Awards 2008 winners were announced on Saturday 19 July at a live show in Southampton, presented by radio station, Original 106 (Solent).

The Mag Awards Winners 
2008:

2007:

References

Alexa Independent and Alternative Music category

External links
The Mag homepage
Phonotonal homepage
The Mag Awards on The BBC
The HantsWeb Awards Winners

Online music magazines published in the United Kingdom
Magazines established in 2003